The 1997–98 Kent Football League season was the 32nd in the history of the Kent Football League, a football competition in England.

The league was won by Herne Bay for the second season in succession, and for the fourth time during the 1990s. Runners-up Folkestone Invicta took promotion to the Southern League.

Corinthian finished bottom of the table for the second season running, and resigned at the end of the season after seven years in the Kent Football League. The club withdrew from senior football for several years in order to concentrate on its youth teams.

Swanley Furness also resigned from the league despite finishing fourth in the table, dropping down to Division Two due to the club's lack of floodlights.

League table

The league featured 21 clubs which competed in the previous season, along with one new club:
VCD Athletic, joined from the Kent County League

Also, Furness changed their name to Swanley Furness, and Woolwich Town changed their name to Erith Town.

League table

References

External links

1997-98
1997–98 in English football leagues